Deng Prefecture was a prefecture in imperial China surrounding modern Dengzhou in Henan, China. It existed intermittently from 587 to 1913. The modern city Dengzhou, created in 1988, retains the name of its former seat.

Geography
The administrative region of Deng Prefecture in the Tang dynasty is in southern Henan, under the administration of Nanyang. It probably includes parts of modern: 
Nanyang
Dengzhou
Xinye County
Neixiang County
Xixia County
Xichuan County
Zhenping County
Nanzhao County

See also
Other Dengzhous
Nanyang Commandery

References
 

Prefectures of the Sui dynasty
Prefectures of the Tang dynasty
Prefectures of the Song dynasty
Prefectures of the Jin dynasty (1115–1234)
Prefectures of Later Liang (Five Dynasties)
Prefectures of Later Han (Five Dynasties)
Prefectures of Later Jin (Five Dynasties)
Prefectures of Later Tang
Prefectures of Later Zhou
Former prefectures in Henan
Prefectures of the Yuan dynasty
Subprefectures of the Ming dynasty
Departments of the Qing dynasty